Minas Shopping is a Belo Horizonte Metro station on Line 1. It was opened in April 1997 as a terminus of the two-station extension of the line from Santa Inês. On 5 January 2002 the line was extended to São Gabriel. The station is located between José Cândido da Silveira and São Gabriel.

References

Belo Horizonte Metro stations
1997 establishments in Brazil
Railway stations opened in 1997